The 2019 Prince Edward Island  Scotties Tournament of Hearts, the provincial women's curling championship for Prince Edward Island, was held from January 9–13 at the Western Community Curling Club in Alberton, Prince Edward Island. The winning Suzanne Birt team represented Prince Edward Island at the 2019 Scotties Tournament of Hearts, Canada's national women's curling championship. The event was held in conjunction with the 2019 PEI Tankard, the provincial men's championship.

Teams Entered

Knockout draw brackets

A Event

B Event

C Event

Playoffs

Playoff #1
Sunday, January 13, 8:00am

Playoff #2
Sunday, January 13, 1:00pm

References

PEI Scotties Tournament of Hearts
2019 in Prince Edward Island
Prince Edward Island Scotties Tournament of Hearts
Curling competitions in Prince Edward Island
Prince County, Prince Edward Island